Tehàma Golf Club is a private golf club outside of Carmel Valley, California owned by Clint Eastwood and is part of the Tehàma private community. Designed by golf architect Jay Morrish, ASGCA and opened in 1999, the private course features 6,506 yards that overlook the Pacific, and it is surrounded by privately owned homesites. Membership is by invitation only.

The Spanish style clubhouse features a bar, restaurant, ballroom, and four suites, with interior design by American art director Henry Bumstead.

Scorecard

References

 Tehama Golf Club official site
 Tehama community and area maps 

Clint Eastwood
Golf clubs and courses in California
Sports venues in Monterey County, California